Ancayoc Cucho (possibly from Quechua anka black-chested buzzard-eagle or eagle, k'uchu corner, inside corner or outward angle, "corner with an eagle") is a mountain in the Andes of Peru, about  high. It is located in the Puno Region, Sandia Province, Limbani District.

References

Mountains of Peru
Mountains of Puno Region